Leonard Woods (November 24, 1807 – December 24, 1878) was the fourth president of Bowdoin College.

Life and career
Born in Newbury, Massachusetts, Woods attended Phillips Andover Academy before graduating from Union College in 1827 with Phi Beta Kappa honors and membership in The Kappa Alpha Society. After having graduated from Andover Theological Seminary, he made a translation of George Christian Knapp's Christian Theology, which became long used as a textbook in American theological seminaries.

When he became president of Bowdoin in 1839, he was only 32 years old. He held his position until 1866. During his tenure, the College built Appleton Hall, the Chapel, and Adams Hall, which housed the Medical School of Maine and the undergraduate laboratories. Woods was a  recipient of advanced degrees from  Colby College, Harvard University, and Bowdoin. He was elected a member of the American Antiquarian Society in 1845.

Woods died in 1878 in Boston, Massachusetts.

References

External links

1807 births
1878 deaths
Presidents of Bowdoin College
Union College (New York) alumni
Harvard University alumni
Phillips Academy alumni
Members of the American Antiquarian Society
People from Newbury, Massachusetts